Obruk is a village in Bor district of Niğde Province, Turkey. At  it is situated to the west of Turkish state highway  . The population of Obruk was 1522 as of 2011.

References 

Villages in Bor District, Niğde
Lycaonia